A pump dispenser is used on containers of  liquids to help dispensing. They might be used on bottles, jars, or tubes. Often the contents are viscous liquids such as creams and lotions.  Some are metered to provide  uniform usage.  Some mix contents from two or more sources prior to dispensing.

Typical products
Liquid soap
Moisturizer
Toothpaste
Lotion
Cosmetics
 Pharmaceuticals

Functioning
Several types of pumps and dispensing systems have been developed.

  Some of the pumps are similar to those of spray bottles.

Examples

See also 
Pump
Toothpaste pump dispenser
 Drum pump

Further reading
 Yam, K. L., "Encyclopedia of Packaging Technology", John Wiley & Sons, pp 275-276, 2009, 
 Soroka, W, "Fundamentals of Packaging Technology", IoPP, 2002,

Standards, ASTM International
D3890 Standard Test Method for Number of Strokes to Prime a Mechanical Pump Dispenser
D4333 Test Method for the Compatibility of Mechanical Pump Dispenser Components 
D4334 Standard Test Method for the Determination of the Dip Tube Retention of a Mechanical Pump Dispenser
D4335 Standard Test Method for Determination of Component Retention of a Mechanical Pump Dispenser
D4336 Standard Test Methods for Determination of the Output Per Stroke of a Mechanical Pump Dispenser
D6534 Standard Test Method for Determining the Peak Force-to-Actuate a Mechanical Pump Dispenser
D6535 Standard Test Method for Determining the Dip Tube Length of a Mechanical Pump Dispenser
D6536 Standard Test Method for Measuring the Dip Tube Length of a Mechanical Pump Dispenser
D6633 Standard Test Method for Basic Functional Stability of a Mechanical Pump Dispenser 
D6654 Standard Test Method for Basic Storage Stability of a Mechanical Pump Dispenser

References 

Packaging
Pumps